Events from the year 2014 in Michigan.

Office holders

State office holders

 Governor of Michigan: Rick Snyder (Republican)
 Lieutenant Governor of Michigan: Brian Calley (Republican) 
 Michigan Attorney General: Bill Schuette (Republican)
 Michigan Secretary of State: Ruth Johnson (Republican)
 Speaker of the Michigan House of Representatives: Jase Bolger (Republican)
 Majority Leader of the Michigan Senate: Randy Richardville (Republican)
 Chief Justice, Michigan Supreme Court: Robert P. Young Jr.

Mayors of major cities

 Mayor of Detroit: Mike Duggan (Democrat)
 Mayor of Grand Rapids: George Heartwell
 Mayor of Warren, Michigan: James R. Fouts
 Mayor of Ann Arbor: John Hieftje/Christopher Taylor (Democrat)
 Mayor of Lansing: Virgil Bernero
 Mayor of Flint: Dayne Walling

Federal office holders

 U.S. Senator from Michigan: Debbie Stabenow (Democrat)
 U.S. Senator from Michigan: Carl Levin (Democrat) 
 House District 1: Dan Benishek (Republican)
 House District 2: Bill Huizenga (Republican)
 House District 3: Justin Amash (Republican)
 House District 4: Dave Camp (Republican)
 House District 5: Dan Kildee (Democrat)
 House District 6: Fred Upton (Republican)
 House District 7: Tim Walberg (Republican)
 House District 8: Mike Rogers (Republican)
 House District 9: Sander Levin (Democrat)
 House District 10: Candice Miller (Republican)
 House District 11: Kerry Bentivolio (Republican)
 House District 12: John Dingell (Democrat)
 House District 13: John Conyers (Democrat)
 House District 14: Gary Peters (Democrat)

Population
In the 2010 United States Census, Michigan was recorded as having a population of 9,883,640 persons, ranking as the eighth most populous state in the country. 

The state's largest cities, having populations of at least 75,000 based on 2016 estimates, were as follows:

Sports

Baseball
 2014 Detroit Tigers season – 
 2014 Michigan Wolverines baseball team - 
 2014 Michigan Wolverines softball team -

American football
 2014 Detroit Lions season – 
 2014 Michigan Wolverines football team - 
 2014 Michigan State Spartans football team - 
 2014 Western Michigan Broncos football team - 
 2014 Central Michigan Chippewas football team - 
 2014 Eastern Michigan Eagles football team -

Basketball
 2013–14 Detroit Pistons season – 
 2013–14 Michigan State Spartans men's basketball team - 
 2013–14 Michigan Wolverines men's basketball team - 
 2013–14 Detroit Titans men's basketball team - 
 2013–14 Michigan State Spartans women's basketball team - 
 2013–14 Michigan Wolverines women's basketball team -

Ice hockey
 2013–14 Detroit Red Wings season – 
 2013–14 Michigan Wolverines men's ice hockey team - In their 27th season under head coach Red Berenson, the Wolverines compiled an 18–13–4 record.
 2013–14 Michigan State Spartans men's ice hockey team - Under head coach Tom Anastos, the Spartans compiled a 15–19–2 record.

Racing
 Port Huron to Mackinac Boat Race - 
 Pure Michigan 400 - 
 Detroit Grand Prix -

Other
 Michigan Open -

Music

Chronology of events

January

February

March
 March 21 - Judge Bernard A. Friedman issued a ruling in DeBoer v. Snyder finding unconstitutional Michigan's ban on adoption by same-sex couples. The decision was later reversed by the Sixth Circuit, but went before the Supreme Court in the landmark decision Obergefell v. Hodges

April

May

June

July

August

September

October

November

December

Deaths
 January 12 - Connie Binsfeld, Lieutenant Governor (1991-1999), at age 89 at Glen Lake, Michigan
 January 25 - Dave Strack, University of Michigan basketball coach (1960–1968), at age 90 in Arizona
 January 31 - Anna Gordy Gaye, record executive and songwriter, at age 92 in Los Angeles
 March 9 - William Clay Ford Sr., chairman/owner of Detroit Lions, at age 88 in Grosse Pointe Shores
 March 15 - Scott Asheton, drummer and co-founder of The Stooges, at age 64 in Ann Arbor
 April 25 - Earl Morrall, quarterback for Michigan State and Detroit Lions (1958–1964), at age 79 in Florida
 May 25- Herb Jeffries, actor, singer and Detroit native, at age 100 in California
 June 1 - Ann B. Davis, University of Michigan alumnus and actress known for role as Alice on The Brady Bunch, at age 88 in San Antonio
 June 9 - Bob Welch, MLB pitcher and Detroit native, at age 57 in California
 June 15 - Casey Kasem, disc jockey and Detroit native, at age 82 in Washington
 July 9 - Tom Veryzer, shortstop for Detroit Tigers (1973–1977), at age 61 in New York
 July 17 - Elaine Stritch, actress and singer, at age 89 in Birmingham, Michigan
 August 8 - Red Wilson, catcher for Detroit Tigers (1954–1960), at age 85 in Wisconsin
 August 11 - Robin Williams, actor and comedian who grew up in Bloomfield Hills, at age 63 in California
 August 20 - Edmund Szoka, bishop of Gaylord (1971-1981), Archbishop of Detroit (1981-1990), at age 86 in Novi, Michigan
 September 10 - Richard Kiel, actor and Detroit native best known as "Jaws" in two James Bond movies, at age 74 in Fresno
 November 17 - Jimmy Ruffin, Motown soul singer ("What Becomes of the Brokenhearted"), at age 78 in Las Vegas 
 December 10 - Don Dufek Sr., fullback at University of Michigan, at age 85 in Ann Arbor
 December 13 - Bill Bonds, TV news anchorman, at age 82 in Bloomfield Hills
 December 18 - Donald J. Albosta, U.S. Congress (1979-1985), at age 89 in St. Charles, Michigan
 December 25 - Alberta Adams, blues singer, at age 97 in Dearborn

Gallery of 2014 deaths

See also
 History of Michigan
 History of Detroit

References